Isaac Gause (December 9, 1843 - April 23, 1920) was a corporal in Union Army during the American Civil War and a recipient of the highest military decoration for valor in combat, the Medal of Honor, for having distinguished himself near Berryville, Virginia, on September 13, 1864.

Medal of Honor citation

Rank and organization:  Corporal, Company E, 2nd Ohio Cavalry
Place and date:  Near Berryville, Virginia, September 13, 1864
Birth:  Trumbull County, Ohio
Date of issue:  September 19, 1864

Citation:

 Capture of the colors of the 8th South Carolina Infantry while engaged in a reconnaissance along the Berryville and Winchester Pike.

Publications

See also

List of Medal of Honor recipients
List of American Civil War Medal of Honor recipients: G–L

References

1843 births
1920 deaths
United States Army Medal of Honor recipients
Union Army soldiers
People from Trumbull County, Ohio
People of Ohio in the American Civil War
Burials at Arlington National Cemetery
American Civil War recipients of the Medal of Honor